Marcel Gebers (born 5 June 1986) is a German former professional footballer who played as a centre-back or defensive midfielder.

Career
In January 2017, Gebers joined Regionalliga Nord side SV Meppen from 3. Liga club FSV Zwickau. He was forced to retire in December 2019 due to knee and hip injuries.

References

External links
 
 

1986 births
Living people
Association football central defenders
Association football midfielders
German footballers
TuS Heeslingen players
VfB Lübeck players
Holstein Kiel players
Kickers Offenbach players
FSV Zwickau players
SV Meppen players
3. Liga players
Regionalliga players